1999–2000 DePaul Blue Demons men's basketball team represented DePaul University during the 1999–2000 men's college basketball season. They received the conference's automatic bid to the NCAA Tournament where they lost in the first round to Kansas.

Schedule

|-
!colspan=9 style=| Conference USA tournament

|-
!colspan=9 style=| 2000 NCAA tournament

References 

DePaul Blue Demons men's basketball seasons
DePaul
DePaul
DePaul Blue Demons men's basketball
DePaul Blue Demons men's basketball